Sugarpop (also stylized as SugarPop) was a child musical group which appeared regularly on GMA Network's concert television show, SOP. All of SugarPop's members are from a child singing competition on QTV named Popstar Kids. The group were given the name SugarPop by Jaya, one of the hosts and singers on the now defunct SOP Rules which was replaced by Party Pilipinas (Party Pilipinas was also replaced by the show Sunday All Stars).

History
The group, consisting of both boys and girls, were formed in 2006 from the former QTV 11 (now GTV) singing contest, Popstar Kids.

Disbandment
The group was disbanded in 2009 due to the reformatting of SOP Rules, which was replaced by Party Pilipinas. The members (excluding Rangadhol) reunited on February 14, 2016.

Post-Sugarpop
Julie Anne San Jose remained with the defunct SOP Rules and continued to be one of the divas of Party Pilipinas. She was also paired up with Elmo Magalona, and they were dubbed JuliElmo, as one of the prominent love teams of GMA 7. She has not only starred in the variety show but had also appeared in a teen drama together with Magalona, entitled Together Forever, with which they also crossed over onto the silver screen in Just One Summer. Now she already had 3 existing albums under GMA Records and 1 EP under VIM Entertainment. Her first album received a Diamond Record, and her second album received Triple Platinum awarded by Philippine Association of the Record Industry (PARI).

Rita Iringan (who now goes by the name Rita Daniela) rejoined her fellow SugarPop mate in Party Pilipinas, has ventured into acting and made several supporting roles both in television and the big screen before rising to fame with her effective portrayal of Aubrey Palomares in My Special Tatay. Iringan released a self-titled album "Rita Daniela" in 2015 under GMA music, she also auditioned for the staging of Miss Saigon in the Philippines, when she was 16, however, she didn't get the part as she was too young for the role. In 2018, she auditioned and got one of the lead roles in Eto Na! Musikal nAPO!

In late 2011 to early 2013, Vanessa Rangadhol joined MYMP as its lead vocalist after Juliet Bahala left the group.

The Sugarpop girls were recently in a vocal group battle production number on Party Pilipinas with another of the country's trios, La Diva.

Renzo later competes in the rival network's singing competition shows Tawag ng Tanghalan in 2018 and Idol Philippines the following year. He is now a member of a singing trio from ABS-CBN named "iDolls".

Pocholo also competed in The Clash as one of the Top 30 contestants where his co-members Rita and Julie hosted the third season in 2020.

Members
 Cholo Bismonte
 Enzo Almario
 Rita Daniela
Julie Anne San Jose

Former members
 Vanessa Rangadhol

Discography

Albums
Sugarpop

Sugarpop (Repackaged)

Awards and nominations

References

External links
 Titik Pilipino album info
 iGMA.tv Forum 

Sugarpop on Facebook Page Vanessa Rangadhol On Instagram  Cholo Bismonte On Instagram  Enzo Almario On Instagram Julie Anne San Jose On Instagram Rita Daniela on Instagram Cholo Bismonte on Facebook.com Enzo Almario on Facebook.com
Filipino pop music groups
Child musical groups
Musical groups established in 2006
Musical groups disestablished in 2010
Musical groups reestablished in 2016